"Rockin' Roll Baby" is a song written by Linda Creed and Thom Bell and performed by The Stylistics. It reached #3 on the U.S. R&B chart, #6 on the UK Singles Chart, #14 on the U.S. pop chart, #44 on the U.S. adult contemporary chart, and #57 on the Canadian pop chart in 1974. It was featured on their 1973 album Rockin' Roll Baby.

The song was arranged and produced by Thom Bell.

The song ranked #96 on Billboard magazine's Top 100 singles of 1974.

Other versions
The Fleshtones released a version of the song on their 1999 album Hitsburg Revisited.

References

1973 songs
1973 singles
Songs written by Linda Creed
Songs written by Thom Bell
The Stylistics songs
Avco Records singles